Musa Simelane (born 2 February 1974) is a Swazi boxer. Representing Swaziland at the 2000 Summer Olympics, Simelane was defeated in his first round bout against Argentine Israel Héctor Perez.

References

1974 births
Living people
Swazi male boxers
Olympic boxers of Eswatini
Boxers at the 2000 Summer Olympics
Featherweight boxers